Cemitério Morada da Paz is a cemetery located in Natal, Brazil.

Notable interments 
 Aluízio Alves – politician for the state of Rio Grande do Norte, Brazil
 Wilma de Faria - 54th governor of Rio Grande do Norte
 Armando Monteiro Filho – minister of Agriculture
 Cléber Santana Loureiro – footballer
 Ariano Vilar Suassuna – writer and playwright

External links
 Grupo Vila site
 

Cemeteries in Natal, Rio Grande do Norte
Buildings and structures in Rio Grande do Norte